Omar Ali Saifuddin II (3 February 1799 – 18 November 1852) was the 23rd Sultan of Brunei, then known as the Bruneian Empire. During his reign, Western powers such as Great Britain and the United States visited the country. His reign saw the British adventurer James Brooke becoming the White Rajah of Sarawak.

Early life
When his father, Sultan Muhammad Jamalul Alam I, died in 1804, he was still a minor followed by a physical deformity of an extra thumb on his right hand. Therefore, his grandfather, Paduka Seri Bega'wan Muhammad Tajuddin ascended the throne for the second time. Due to the advanced age of Sultan Muhammad Tajuddin, his younger brother, Pengiran Di-Gadong Pengiran Muda Muhammad Kanzul Alam acted as regent. When Sultan Muhammad Tajuddin died in 1807, the regent became the 21st Sultan of Brunei and was known as Sultan Muhammad Kanzul Alam. Sultan Muhammad Kanzul Alam then appointed his own son, Pengiran Anak Muhammad Alam as heir to the throne of Brunei.

In 1825, when Pengiran Muda Omar Ali Saifuddin had come of age, he asserted his claim to the throne. Pengiran Muda Omar Ali Saifuddin was supported by most nobles as he was the rightful heir according to Brunei’s royal traditions. The Kris Si Naga was in the possession of his mother, thus strengthened his claim. To end the succession crisis, Sultan Muhammad Alam stepped down from the throne and was sentenced to death. In 1828, Pengiran Muda Omar Ali Saifuddin ascended the throne as the 23rd Sultan of Brunei, taking the title Sultan Omar Ali Saifuddin II.

Reign (1828-1852)
After his succession to the throne, he appointed his uncle Pengiran Muda Hashim as the Bendahara (Prime Minister) as a sign of compassion to heal their family relations after the Second Civil War. Hashim was also the late Sultan Muhammad Alam and Pengiran Noralam's brother.

Control over Sarawak 
During Sultan Omar Ali Saifuddin II’s reign, he tried to establish absolute control over Sarawak (present day Kuching). Before this, only the Pengirans who acted on behalf of the Sultan, were in charge in Kuching collecting taxes and revenues from the local people. Especially after the discovery of antimony ore in Sarawak, the Sultan became more ambitious in gaining control of the economy of Sarawak. The Governor of Sarawak at that time, Pengiran Indera Mahkota Mohammad Salleh, also used forced labour to run the antimony mines. A disturbance occurred in Sarawak where an uprising against Brunei rule led by Datu Patinggi Ali, who was one of the ruling chiefs in Sarawak. Due to the worsened situation in Sarawak, Pengiran Muda Hashim was ordered to restore order in the area.

James Brooke 
At the time of chaotic situation in Sarawak, a British explorer, James Brooke, came to Sarawak on his schooner Royalist looking for trade opportunities in 1839. Brooke came to Sarawak from Singapore as he had heard about Sarawak's economic potentials. Also, at this time, Brooke met Pengiran Muda Hashim, who was the uncle of Sultan Omar Ali Saifuddin II, and the two became close friends. Pengiran Muda Hashim asked for Brooke's assistance to help him to suppress the disturbances in Sarawak, in return, Pengiran Muda Hashim ensured the appointment of Brooke as the new Governor of Sarawak, after the current Governor Raja Pengiran Indera Mahkota had been deposed.

Muda Hashim later appointed James as the temporary governor in 1841 and in 1842, he sailed to Brunei to be given the title of Tuan Besar (Great Lord) and again appointed as the representative in charge of affairs in Old Sarawak by the Sultan. After the disturbances in Sarawak successfully quelled, James Brooke met Pengiran Muda Hashim in Kuching to ensure his promises were kept. Pengiran Muda Hashim agreed to honour his promise. In 1842, Sultan Omar Ali Saifuddin II confirmed the appointment of James Brooke as the Governor of Sarawak in a treaty. The treaty officially recognised James Brooke as the Raja of Sarawak and the Sultan had to cede Sarawak to James Brooke. The ceding of Kuching to Brooke marked the beginning of further cessation of territories to James Brooke and later, the British North Borneo Company.

Treaty of Labuan 
In October 1843, Sultan offered the island of Labuan to Britain. Notably on 6 April 1845, the relations between Brunei and the United States first began when the warship USS Constitution visited and anchored off Brunei Bay. In July 1846, James Brooke and Admiral Sir Thomas Cochrane together began a naval attack on Brunei Town and depose the Sultan. The Sultan pledged loyalty towards Queen Victoria after he was reinstated. 

That same year on 18 December, the Sultan reluctantly had to cede Labuan to the British under the Treaty of Labuan after threats of attack made by the Royal Navy. In 1847, Sultan Omar Ali Saifuddin II signed the Treaty of Friendship and Commerce with Britain which provide them with full control over Brunei's trade, and on 23 June 1850, he signed the Treaty of Peace, Friendship, Commerce and Navigation with the United States.

Later life and death
In the 1850's, Saifuddin's health began rapidly deteriorating. The Sultan chose to distance himself from ruling the state but he never abdicated the Throne. At the moment, his son-in-law Abdul Momin was appointed a regent. Omar Ali Saifuddin II died in 1852 and was succeeded by his son-in-law, Sultan Abdul Momin as the 24th Sultan of Brunei. He was buried at Kubah Makam Di Raja or the Bukit Penggal Royal Mausoleum, Bandar Seri Begawan.

Ancestry

References

19th-century Sultans of Brunei
1799 births
1852 deaths